The 1965 All-Ireland Minor Football Championship was the 34th staging of the All-Ireland Minor Football Championship, the Gaelic Athletic Association's premier inter-county Gaelic football tournament for boys under the age of 18.

Offaly entered the championship as defending champions, however, they were defeated in the All-Ireland semi-final.

On 26 September 1965, Derry won the championship following a 2-8 to 2-4 defeat of Kerry in the All-Ireland final. This was their first All-Ireland title.

Results

Connacht Minor Football Championship

Quarter-Finals

Sligo 1-11 Leitrim 0-4.

Semi-Finals

Roscommon 3-6 Sligo 0-5 Tubbercurry.

Mayo 3-18 Galway 2-2 Castlebar.

Final

Roscommon 2-10 Mayo 1-10 Tuam.

Leinster Minor Football Championship

Munster Minor Football Championship

Ulster Minor Football Championship

All-Ireland Minor Football Championship

Semi-Finals

Roscommon 4-8 Derry 4-5 Croke Park. 

Final

Championship statistics

Miscellaneous

 Derry win the Ulster title for the first time in their history. This provincial triumph is later translated into All-Ireland success.

References

1965
All-Ireland Minor Football Championship